This list of castles in the Pays de la Loire is a list of medieval castles or château forts in the region in western France.

Links in italics are links to articles in the French Wikipedia.

Loire-Atlantique

Maine-et-Loire

Mayenne

Sarthe

Vendée

See also
 List of castles in France
 List of châteaux in France

References

 
Castles
Pays de la Loire

fr:Liste des châteaux des Pays-de-la-Loire